Rosa Cuthbert Guy (September 1, 1922 – June 3, 2012) was a Trinidad-born American writer who grew up in the New York metropolitan area. Her family had immigrated and she was orphaned when young.  Raised in foster homes, she later was acclaimed for her books of fiction for adults and young people that stressed supportive relationships.

Guy lived and worked in New York City, where she was among the founders of the Harlem Writers Guild in 1950.  It was highly influential in encouraging African-American writers to gain publication and had a high rate of success.  Guy died of cancer on June 3, 2012.

Early years
Rosa Cuthbert was born in 1922 in Diego Martin, on the Caribbean island of Trinidad. She and her younger sister Ameze were left with relatives when their parents Audrey and Henry Cuthbert emigrated in 1927 to the United States. The children did not join their parents in Harlem, New York, until 1932. The following year their mother became ill, and Rosa and her sister were sent to Brooklyn to live with a cousin. The cousin's espousal of Garveyism and black nationalistic politics deeply affected Rosa. After their mother's death in 1934, the two girls returned to Harlem to live with their father, who remarried.

When their father died in 1937, the orphaned girls were taken into the welfare system and lived in foster homes. Rosa left school at the age of 14 and took a job in a garment factory to support herself and her sister.

Career
In 1941, at the age of 19, Rosa met and married Warner Guy. While her husband was serving in the Second World War, she continued working in the factory. A co-worker introduced her to the American Negro Theatre, where she studied acting; other graduates included Harry Belafonte and Sidney Poitier. In 1942, her son Warner Guy, Jr, was born.

After the war, Rosa Guy moved to Connecticut with her husband and son. Five years later she and her husband divorced, and she returned to New York City.

Writers' community
In 1950, along with novelist John Oliver Killens, Guy formed a workshop that was to become the Harlem Writers Guild (HWG). Its goal was "to develop and aid in the publication of works by writers of the African Diaspora". Its members and participants included Willard Moore, Walter Christmas, Maya Angelou, Dr. John Henrik Clarke, Paule Marshall, Audre Lorde, Alice Childress, Ossie Davis, Ruby Dee, and Douglas Turner Ward. The Guild was very influential, nurturing more than half of all successful African-American writers between 1950 and 1971; they were associated with the workshop. Guy also belonged to On Guard for Freedom, a Black nationalist literary organization founded by Calvin Hicks on the Lower East Side of New York City. Other members included LeRoi Jones, Sarah E. Wright and Harold Cruse.  On Guard was active in the political realm, supporting Congolese liberation leader Patrice Lumumba and protesting the United States-sponsored Bay of Pigs invasion at Cuba.

In 1954, Guy wrote and performed in her first play, Venetian Blinds, which was successfully produced Off-Broadway at the Tropical Theater.

Publications
Two stories by Guy, "Magnify" and "Carnival", appeared in the Trinidad Nation newspaper in 1965. The following year, her first novel, Bird at My Window, was published. Maya Angelou commented on this novel and said: 
This book was welcomed when it was first published in 1966. Its brave examination of a loving, yet painful, relationship between a Black mother and her son is even more important today. Rosa Guy is a fine writer and she continuously gives us new issues to contemplate. Welcome Bird at My Window.

After the assassination of Martin Luther King in 1968, Guy set out to record the voices of young black Americans in a 1970 documentary work entitled Children of Longing, which contains first-hand accounts of the experiences and aspirations of young people "growing up in a hostile world". She traveled in the Caribbean, living for a while in Haiti and Trinidad.

Most of Guy's books are about the dependability of family members and friends who care and love each other, and her trilogy of novels for young people — The Friends (1973), Ruby (1976), and Edith Jackson (1978) — is based on her own personal experiences, as well as those of many young African Americans growing up in New York City with little or no money or support from family. Ruby tells the story of a young girl seeking love and friendship, who finds it in Daphne Duprey, allowing both girls a new insight of relationships and love.

Guy's 1985 novel, My Love, My Love: Or, The Peasant Girl, has been described as a Caribbean re-telling of Hans Christian Andersen's "The Little Mermaid "with a dash of Shakespeare's Romeo and Juliet." In the tale, Desiree is a beautiful peasant who falls in love with a handsome upper-class boy whom she saved in an accident. His family does not approve of Desiree, for she is too black and too poor for their son who will be king. Concepts of sacrifice and pure love reign throughout the novel. It was adapted for the Broadway musical, Once on This Island by Lynn Ahrens and Stephen Flaherty. The show's original cast ran for a year, from 1990 to 1991, and was then revived in December 2017 at Circle in the Square Theater. It won the 2018 Tony Award for Best Revival of a Musical.

Death
Rosa Guy died of cancer in 2012 at her home on the Upper West Side of Manhattan, aged 89. Her obituary was included in The Socialite who Killed a Nazi with Her Bare Hands: And 144 Other Fascinating People who Died this Year, a collection of New York Times obituaries published in 2012.

Awards
Rosa Guy's work received The New York Times Outstanding Book of the Year citation (for The Friends, in 1973), the Coretta Scott King Award, and the American Library Association's Best Book for Young Adults Award.

Works
 Bird at My Window (London: Souvenir Press, 1966; Allison & Busby, 1985; Virago, 1989; Coffee House Press, 2001)
 Children of Longing (essays, introduction by Julius Lester; New York: Holt, Rinehart, 1970)
 The Friends (New York: Holt, Rinehart & Winston, 1973; Macmillan Educational, 1982; New York: Bantam Books, 1983; Perfection Learning, 1995; Bantam Doubleday Dell Books for Young Readers, 1996; Heinemann, 1996; Glencoe McGraw-Hill, 2001)
 Ruby (New York: Viking Press, 1976; London: Gollancz, 1981; Puffin Books, 1989)
 Edith Jackson (New York: Viking Juvenile, 1978; London: Gollancz, 1978; Longman, 1989; Puffin, 1995)
 The Disappearance (New York: Delacorte, 1979; Puffin, 1985)
 Mirror of Her Own (New York: Delacorte, 1981)
 Mother Crocodile: An Uncle Amadou Tale from Senegal (illustrated by John Steptoe - Coretta Scott King Award; New York: Delacorte, 1981; Doubleday, 1993). A translation of Birago Diop's Maman-Caïman (1961)
 A Measure of Time (New York: Henry Holt, 1983; London: Virago, 1983)
 New Guys Around the Block (New York: Delacorte, 1983; London: Gollancz, 1983; Laurel Leaf, 1992: Puffin, 1995)
 Paris, Pee Wee and Big Dog (London: Gollancz, 1984; New York: Delacorte, 1985; Puffin, 1986; Nelson Thornes Ltd, 1988)
 My Love, My Love, or the Peasant Girl (New York: Holt, Rinehart & Winston, 1985; London: Virago, 2000; Coffee House Press, 2002)
 And I Heard a Bird Sing (New York: Delacorte, 1987; London: Gollancz, 1987; Puffin, 1994)
 The Ups and Downs of Carl Davis III (Delacorte, 1989; Gollancz, 1989; Collins Educational, 1994)
 Billy the Great Child (London: Gollancz, 1991; New York: Delacorte, 1992)
 The Music of Summer (New York: Delacorte, 1992)
 The Sun, the Sea, A Touch of the Wind (New York: E. P. Dutton, 1995)

References

Further reading
 J. Saunders Redding, review of Bird at My Window, The Crisis 103.3 (April 1966), pp. 225–227.

External links
Banyan: Interview with Rosa Guy, 2nd International Conference of Caribbean Women Writers, Trinidad & Tobago, April 27, 1990.
African American Literary Bookclub: Rosa Guy

1922 births
2012 deaths
20th-century African-American women writers
20th-century African-American writers
20th-century American dramatists and playwrights
20th-century American novelists
20th-century American short story writers
20th-century American women writers
21st-century African-American people
21st-century African-American women
African-American dramatists and playwrights
African-American novelists
American women novelists
American women short story writers
Black Arts Movement writers
Deaths from cancer in New York (state)
People from Diego Martin
Trinidad and Tobago emigrants to the United States
Trinidad and Tobago novelists
Trinidad and Tobago women novelists